The Cabinet of Ministers of the Republic of Azerbaijan is the highest executive body of Azerbaijan, the executive and governing body over the ministries and other central executive bodies under the President of the Republic of Azerbaijan.

Chiefs of State

|President
|İlham Aliyev
|New Azerbaijan Party (YAP)
|15 October 2003
|-
|Vice President
|Mehriban Aliyeva
|New Azerbaijan Party (YAP)
|21 February 2017
|}
The head of state and head of government are separate from the country's law-making body. The President is the head of the state and head of the executive branch. The people elect the president; the President appoints the Vice President, and the Prime Minister is nominated by the President and confirmed by the National Assembly of Azerbaijan. The President appoints all cabinet-level government administrators (ministers, heads of other central and local executive bodies) and has the competence to chair meetings of the Cabinet. President also has the competence to cancel the orders and resolutions of the Cabinet. In 2009 Referendum, the Constitution of Azerbaijan was amended, abolishing any term limit for the office of President.

Cabinet members
The Cabinet of Ministers is composed of the prime minister, their deputies, ministers, and heads of other central bodies of executive power. The Cabinet resigns when a newly elected president takes their rights and begins carrying out their powers. As a rule, the prime minister chairs the meetings of the Cabinet.

Procedure for appointment 
The President appoints the prime minister with the consent of the National Assembly. The proposed candidate for the post of prime minister is submitted for consideration to the Assembly by the President not later than one month from the day when the President begins carrying out their powers, or not later than two weeks from the day of the resignation of the Cabinet. The Assembly adopts a resolution concerning the candidate to the post of prime minister not later than within one week from the day when such candidature has been proposed. Should this procedure be violated, or candidatures proposed by the President for the post of prime minister be rejected three times, then the President may appoint a prime minister without consent of the Assembly.

List of cabinets 

 First cabinet of Azerbaijan Democratic Republic
 Second cabinet of Azerbaijan Democratic Republic
 Third cabinet of Azerbaijan Democratic Republic

 Fourth cabinet of Azerbaijan Democratic Republic

 Fifth cabinet of Azerbaijan Democratic Republic
 8th Government of Azerbaijan

Picture gallery

See also
 President of Azerbaijan
 Vice President of Azerbaijan
 Prime Minister of Azerbaijan
 Cabinets of Azerbaijan Democratic Republic in 1918 - 1920
 First cabinet of Azerbaijan Democratic Republic
 List of national legislatures
 List of national leaders

References

 
Main
Azerbaijan
Azerbaijan